The Intercontinental Real Estate Corporation is a SEC Registered Investment Adviser that manages private equity real estate investments and provides real estate services for domestic and international clients. Established in Boston, Massachusetts in 1959 as a construction firm by Petros A. Palandjian, an Armenian immigrant from Iran, the corporation has acquired, developed, managed, and owned over US$10 Billion of real estate assets of all real property types.

Petros Palandjian died in 1996 of gastric cancer. His son, Peter Palandjian, is the CEO  of Intercontinental Real Estate Corporation.

Today, Intercontinental manages a portfolio in excess of $4 billion for its clients. The Intercontinental portfolio is diversified both by robust property mix and by geography. Fund strategies actively seek opportunities to invest in both Core and Core-Plus properties, as well as in Value-Add operating properties and development projects.

In December 2019, Intercontinental Real Estate Corporation has bought its first commercial office asset at the Roosevelt Commons, Seattle for $157m, on behalf of one of its controlled funds.

References

Real estate companies of the United States
American companies established in 1959
Financial services companies established in 1959
Real estate companies established in 1959
Companies based in Boston
1959 establishments in Massachusetts